Pseudoalteromonas elyakovii is a marine bacterium.

History
Alteromonas elyakovii was isolated from the mussel Crenomytilus grayanus in Troitsa Bay in 1985. In 2000, A. elyakovii was reclassified as Pseudoalteromonas elyakovii along with five strains of bacteria which had been isolated from the seaweed Laminaria japonica.

References

External links
 
Type strain of Pseudoalteromonas elyakovii at BacDive -  the Bacterial Diversity Metadatabase

Alteromonadales